Werbeliner See is a lake in Saxony, Germany. At an elevation of 98.0 m, its surface area is 4.5 km². The lake is a part of the Central German Lake District.

Lakes of Saxony